MSC Poesia is a cruise ship owned and operated by MSC Cruises. She was built in 2008 by the Aker Yards  shipyard in St. Nazaire, France. She is the first ship in the MSC Cruises fleet to be officially named outside Italy, at the Port of Dover, Kent on 5 April 2008, by Sophia Loren.

In 2008 and 2009, MSC Poesia sailed on a series of 7-night cruises from Venice to Italy, Greece and Turkey. Since 2010 the ship sails in Northern Europe during the summer season.

Incidents
On 6 June 2008, MSC Poesia and  collided in the Adriatic Sea near Dubrovnik. No one was hurt, the damage was minimal, and ships both continued their scheduled itinerary with no delays. The cause was determined to be the MSC Poesias anchor loosening.

On 22 February 2019, the ship was struck again, by sister ship . MSC Orchestra had been departing Buenos Aires, Argentina, when a navigational error caused her to crash into MSC Poesia. MSC Poesia only sustained minor bow damage.

2012 grounding
While heading to Port Lucaya near Freeport, Bahamas, on 7 January 2012, MSC Poesia ran aground on top of a reef. The grounding did not stop the beach-goers (maiden voyagers of the annual "Holy Ship!" music festival cruise featuring such popular dance music artists as Fatboy Slim, Dillon Francis and Diplo), as tender boats were able to ferry passengers from anchorage (or reefage) to the shores of Port Lucaya. According to Captain Archer, a local captain in the port, "they waited for a tide to get high at 1800hrs she was pulled off with 4 tugs and a fifth standing by. At 2000hrs, she was free and continued on her journey at 19.5 knots to little Salvador. A statement from MSC Cruises was released: "In navigating the harbor off Port Lucaya in the Grand Bahamas, MSC Poesia ran aground at 6:50 a.m. Saturday morning. The ship and its guests were always completely safe and all onboard equipment and services continued to operate normally including all previously scheduled tender service and shore excursions".

References

External links

Official MSC Poesia Website
Current Position

Poesia
Ships built in France
2007 ships